Talk About a Stranger is a 1952 American film noir directed by David Bradley and starring George Murphy, Nancy Davis and Billy Gray. The motion picture was shot by noted cinematographer John Alton, A.S.C. and was based on Charlotte Armstrong's short story "The Enemy", which was published in the May 1951 issue of Ellery Queen's Mystery Magazine and was subsequently chosen for the top prize in the Mystery Magazine's yearly selection of best stories.

Plot
The picture tells the story of Bud Fontaine Jr. (Billy Gray), who takes an instant dislike of Matlock, a strange new neighbor in town (Kurt Kasznar).

After his dog turns up dead by poison, Bud blames the stranger and sets off a campaign to smear his name and spread vicious rumors about him.

His parents (George Murphy and Nancy Davis) can't seem to handle the boy. After Bud endangers the crops in the valley by his vandalism of the neighbor's oil tank, and is told the dog was killed by eating poisoned meat meant for coyotes, Bud comes to realize that people are not always what they appear to be.

Cast
 George Murphy as Robert Fontaine Sr.
 Nancy Davis as Marge Fontaine
 Billy Gray as Robert 'Bud' Fontaine Jr.
 Lewis Stone as William J. Wardlaw
 Kurt Kasznar as Dr. Paul Mahler, alias Matlock
 Anna Glomb as Camille Wardlaw

Reception
According to MGM records the film earned $278,000 in the U.S. and Canada and $97,000 elsewhere resulting in a loss of $276,000 despite its low cost.

References

External links
 
 
 
 

1952 films
1952 drama films
American black-and-white films
Film noir
Films directed by David Bradley
Films based on short fiction
Films scored by David Buttolph
Metro-Goldwyn-Mayer films
Films based on works by Charlotte Armstrong
American drama films
1950s English-language films
1950s American films